T A Shahid (25 May 1972 – 28 September 2012) was a scriptwriter in the Malayalam film industry.

He died of cirrhosis aged 41 on 28 September 2012 in a private hospital in Kozhikode where he had been undergoing treatment for sometime.

Filmography

References

External links
 
 https://www.imdb.com/name/nm1525010/
 

Indian male screenwriters
Malayali people
Malayalam screenwriters
2012 deaths
1970 births
Screenwriters from Kerala
21st-century Indian dramatists and playwrights
21st-century Indian male writers
21st-century Indian screenwriters